Frank Roberts may refer to:

 Frank Crowther Roberts (1891–1982), English recipient of the Victoria Cross
 Frank Roberts (Australian footballer) (1912–1989), Australian rules footballer
 Frank Roberts (boxer) (1945–2011), Australian boxer
 Frank Roberts (diplomat) (1907–1998), British diplomat
 Frank Roberts (footballer, born 1893) (1893–1961), English footballer
 Frank Roberts (Australian politician) (1913–1992), Lord Mayor of Brisbane
 Frank Roberts (model maker) (1882–1963), New Zealand model maker
 Frank H. H. Roberts (1897–1966), American archaeologist and anthropologist
 Frank L. Roberts (1915–1993), American politician 
 Frank Leon Roberts (born 1982), American activist, writer and college professor

See also
 
 Francis Roberts (disambiguation)
 Robert Franks (disambiguation)
 Robert Frank (disambiguation)